Anthropodyptes is a poorly known monotypic genus of extinct penguin. It contains the single species Anthropodyptes gilli, known from a Middle Miocene humerus from Australia. The bone is somewhat similar to those found in members of the New Zealand genus Archaeospheniscus and thus this genus might, like them, belong to the subfamily Palaeeudyptinae.

References
 Simpson, George Gaylord (1971): A review of the pre-Pleistocene penguins of New Zealand. Bulletin of the American Museum of Natural History 144: 319–378. PDF fulltext

Extinct monotypic bird genera
Prehistoric bird genera
Miocene birds
Extinct penguins
Spheniscidae
Miocene birds of Australia